Vysokovsk is a town in Klinsky District of Moscow Oblast, Russia, located  northwest of Moscow. Population:

History
It was founded in 1879 due to the construction of a textile factory by the Vysokovskaya Manufactory Company. Two minor settlements servicing the factory—Vysokoye and Novy Bazar—grew into one, named Vysokovsky, in 1928. It was granted town status in 1940 and renamed Vysokovsk.

Demographics

Geography

Climate

Education

Primary and secondary education
There are two secondary schools in Vysokovsk.

Administrative and municipal status
Within the framework of administrative divisions, it is, together with seventeen rural localities, incorporated within Klinsky District as the Town of Vysokovsk. As a municipal division, the Town of Vysokovsk is incorporated within Klinsky Municipal District as Vysokovsk Urban Settlement.

References

Notes

Sources

External links
Unofficial website of Vysokovsk 

Cities and towns in Moscow Oblast